Tidhar (lit. Plane tree) is a moshav in southern Israel. Located in the north-western Negev between Ofakim and Netivot, it falls under the jurisdiction of Bnei Shimon Regional Council and covers an area of around 1,000 dunams.

History
The moshav was established in 1953 by Moroccan immigrants and refugees. Its name is taken from the Book of Isaiah, specifically Isaiah 41:19:
I will plant in the wilderness the cedar, the acacia-tree, and the myrtle, and the oil-tree; I will set in the desert the cypress, the plane-tree, and the larch together;
Two other nearby moshavim, Brosh (cypress) and Ta'ashur (larch) take their name from this passage and the three of them are known as the Moshavei Yahdav (lit. the "Together Moshavim").

References

External links
Official website 
Tidhar Negev Information Centre

Moshavim
Populated places established in 1953
Populated places in Southern District (Israel)
1953 establishments in Israel
Moroccan-Jewish culture in Israel